Contraconus tryoni is an extinct species of sea snail, a marine gastropod mollusk, in the family Conidae, the cone snails and their allies.

References

 Heilprin, Angelo. Explorations on the West Coast of Florida and in the okeechobee wilderness: with special reference to the geology and zoology of the Floridian Peninsula. Vol. 1. Wagner Free Institute of Science of Philadelphia, 1887.

tryoni
Gastropods described in 1887